The 1942 National Invitation Tournament was the 1942 edition of the annual NCAA college basketball competition.

Selected teams
Below is a list of the 8 teams selected for the tournament.

 CCNY
 Creighton
 Long Island
 Rhode Island
 Toledo
 West Texas State
 West Virginia
 Western Kentucky State

Bracket
Below is the tournament bracket.

See also
 1942 NCAA basketball tournament
 1942 NAIA Basketball Tournament

References

National Invitation
National Invitation Tournament
1940s in Manhattan
Basketball competitions in New York City
College sports tournaments in New York City
National Invitation Tournament
National Invitation Tournament
Sports in Manhattan